Dahlia Greidinger (July 27, 1926 – July 16, 1979) was an Israeli scientist who helped develop the country's chemical industry.

Early life, family and education
Dahlia Greidinger was born in Neve Tzedek, Tel Aviv. She was a fifth generation Sabra. Her parents were Miriam Rokach and Joseph Katzenelbogen-Katz.

She attended the Hebrew Reali School of Haifa. She earned an M.Sc. in chemistry from the University of Lausanne, Switzerland, where she graduated with distinction.

Career
Returning to Israel after her education in Switzerland, she was the first editor of Israel Scientific Council Magazine. In 1951, Greidinger became a teaching and research assistant at the Technion — Israel Institute of Technology. After completing her doctorate in 1958, she began working  at Deshanim Fertilizers & Chemicals Ltd. By 1969, she was appointed director of Research and Development and elected to the board of directors. The company grew to become Israel's largest supplier of  fertilizers.

Greidinger wrote for scientific publications and was the holder of several patents, among them a patent on Controlled release particulate fertilizer composition, 'Stable liquid N-P-K fertilizer composition and method of use', a liquid fertilizer composition storable for 6–8 months, and Solid Ammonium Polyphosphate Compositions and Manufacture. She was a member of the European Committee for Expansion, the Association of Academic Women and the Anti-Cancer Association.

Legacy
The Feinberg Graduate School of Weizmann Institute of Science awards a fellowship for cancer research financed by the Dahlia Greidinger Anti-Cancer Fund. In honor of her contributions in the field of chemistry and fertilization systems, the family established the Dahlia Greidinger Fertilizer Research Fund.

Personal life
She married Kalman (Coleman) Greidinger, a cinema company businessman, in October 1950. They had four children, including sons Moshe ("Mooky") and Israel, who are leaders in their father and grandfather's successor company, Cineworld.

She died of cancer in 1979 after battling the disease for ten years.

See also
Agricultural research in Israel

References

External links 
Dahlia Greidinger Anti-Cancer Fund
Dahlia Greidinger International Workshop on Controlled/Slow-Release Fertilizers
Dahlia Greidinger International Symposium on Nutrient Management under Salinity and Water Stress Symposium at Technion — Israel Institute of Technology, 1999

1926 births
20th-century Israeli Jews
Jews in Mandatory Palestine
Israeli scientists
1979 deaths
Hebrew Reali School alumni